Hovdhaugen is a surname. Notable people with the surname include:

Einar Hovdhaugen (1908–1996), Norwegian politician
Even Hovdhaugen (1941–2018), Norwegian linguist